Zhu Chenjie (born 23 August 2000) is a Chinese professional footballer who plays for Chinese Super League club Shanghai Shenhua and the China national football team.

Club career
Zhu Chenjie started his football career when he transferred to Shanghai Shenhua's youth academy in March 2018 after the club bought Genbao Football Base's under-19 players. He was promoted to the first team squad in the 2018 season. Zhu made his debut for the club on 22 July 2018 in a 2–2 away draw against Henan Jianye. In doing so at 17 years and 333 days old, he became the youngest player ever to start for Shanghai Shenhua. On 30 September 2018, he scored his first senior goal in a 3–1 home win against Guangzhou R&F, becoming the youngest goalscorer ever for the club aged 18 years and 38 days as well as the first player born after 2000 to score in the Chinese Super League.

International
Zhu made his debut for the Chinese national team on 7 June 2019 in a 2–0 win against the Philippines, coming on as a substitute for Ji Xiang in the 33rd minute. On 24 March 2022, Zhu scored his first international goal in a 1–1 draw against Saudi Arabia in the 2022 FIFA World Cup qualification, converting in a second-half penalty. He then became the first Chinese player born in the 21st century to debut, provide an assist and score a goal for the national team.

On 20 July 2022, Zhu captained the national team for the first time against South Korea in the 2022 EAFF E-1 Football Championship, however he inadvertently headed in an own goal in the first half of an eventual 3–0 defeat.

Career statistics

Club statistics

International statistics

Honours

Club
Shanghai Shenhua
Chinese FA Cup: 2019

Individual
Chinese Football Association Young Player of the Year: 2019
Chinese Super League Team of the Year: 2019

References

External links

2000 births
Living people
Chinese footballers
China international footballers
Footballers from Shanghai
Shanghai Shenhua F.C. players
Chinese Super League players
Association football defenders
China under-20 international footballers